The 1940 Northampton by-election was held on 6 December 1940.  The by-election was held due to the resignation of the incumbent Conservative MP, Mervyn Manningham-Buller.  It was won by the Conservative candidate Spencer Summers.

References

1940 elections in the United Kingdom
1940 in England
20th century in Northamptonshire
Politics of Northampton
By-elections to the Parliament of the United Kingdom in Northamptonshire constituencies
December 1940 events